Idelfonso (Idelfonsus) is a Spanish given name, ultimately from  Gothic Hildefuns, the name of 7th-century saint Ildephonsus of Toledo.

People
Ildefons Cerdà, Spanish urban planner
Ildefonso Falcones, Spanish author
Ildefonso Lima, Andorran footballer
Ildefonso Puigdendolas, Spanish military officer
Ildefonso Santos, Filipino educator and poet
Ildefonso Santos Jr., Filipino architect
Ildefonso Schuster, archbishop of Milan, Italy
Konstanty Ildefons Gałczyński, Polish writer and poet

Places
Ildefonso Islands, group of islands in Chile.
San Ildefonso Ixtahuacán, a municipality in Guatemala.
San Ildefonso Peninsula, a peninsula in the Philippines.
San Ildefonso Pueblo, New Mexico, a census-designated place in the USA.
San Ildefonso, Bulacan, a municipality in the Philippines.
San Ildefonso, Ilocos Sur, a municipality in the Philippines.
San Ildefonso, San Vicente, a municipality in El Salvador.
San Ildefonso, a town in Spain.
Santo Ildefonso, a parish in Portugal.

Treaty of San Ildefonso
First Treaty of San Ildefonso of 1777 between Spain and Portugal.
Second Treaty of San Ildefonso of 1796 between Spain and France, allying the two nations.
Third Treaty of San Ildefonso of 1800 between Spain and France, by which Spain returned Louisiana to France.

Other
Convent of St. Ildefonso, a book by Regina Marie Roche.
, a British Royal Navy ship.
Palacio Real de la Granja de San Ildefonso, a palace in the Spanish province of Segovia.
Church of Saint Ildefonso, an 18th-century church in Porto

See also
Alfonso
Alfonso (disambiguation)